West Hughes Humphreys (August 26, 1806 – October 16, 1882) was the 3rd Attorney General of Tennessee and a United States district judge of the United States District Court for the Eastern District of Tennessee, the United States District Court for the Middle District of Tennessee, and the United States District Court for the Western District of Tennessee. 

He was ultimately impeached by the United States House of Representatives in 1862, being convicted and removed from office by the United States Senate for supporting the Confederate States of America during the American Civil War. He was banned from federal service for life. He served as a Confederate judge from 1861 until the end of the war in 1865.

Education and career

Born on August 26, 1806, in Montgomery County, Tennessee, Humphreys was the son of attorney and judge Parry Wayne Humphreys and his wife. His father later served on the State Supreme Court, was elected to one term in Congress, and served nearly two decades on the state judicial circuit. 

Humphreys was educated privately and attended the law department of Transylvania University. Failing to graduate due to ill health, he read law with an established firm in 1828. He passed the bar and entered private practice in Clarksville, Tennessee from 1828 to 1829. 

He moved to Somerville, Tennessee, continuing in private practice from 1829 to 1839. He was elected and served as a member of the Tennessee House of Representatives from 1835 to 1838. He was the 3rd Attorney General of Tennessee from 1839 to 1851. He was reporter for the Tennessee Supreme Court from 1839 to 1851. He resumed private practice in Nashville, Tennessee from 1851 to 1853.

Federal judicial service

Humphreys was nominated by President Franklin Pierce on March 24, 1853, to a joint seat on the United States District Court for the Eastern District of Tennessee, the United States District Court for the Middle District of Tennessee and the United States District Court for the Western District of Tennessee vacated by Judge Morgan Welles Brown. He was confirmed by the United States Senate on March 26, 1853, and received his commission the same day. During the American Civil War, his service terminated on June 26, 1862, due to impeachment, conviction, and removal from office for support of the Confederacy.

Impeachment, conviction and removal from office

Humphreys served as a Judge of the Confederate District Court for the District of Tennessee from 1861 to 1865.

On May 19, 1862, the United States House of Representatives voted to impeach Humphreys on the following charges: publicly calling for secession; giving aid to an armed rebellion; conspiring with Jefferson Davis; serving as a Confederate judge; confiscating the property of Military Governor Andrew Johnson and United States Supreme Court Justice John Catron; and imprisoning a Union sympathizer with "intent to injure him."

On June 26, 1862, the United States Senate began the trial of the impeachment in his absence and later that day unanimously convicted him of all charges presented, except that of confiscating the property of Andrew Johnson. Humphreys was removed from office and barred from holding office under the United States for life. He held his Confederate judgeship until the end of the Civil War.

Later career and death

Following the end of the American Civil War, Humphreys resumed private practice in Nashville from 1866 to 1882. In later life, Humphreys argued for the prohibition of alcohol and wrote several books. He died on October 16, 1882, in Nashville.

Family

Humphreys' father, Parry Wayne Humphreys, was an attorney, judge who served on the state Supreme Court and nearly two decades in the state judiciary, and one term as United States Representative from Tennessee. 

Humphreys was a member of the Methodist Episcopal Church, South. He married and had a daughter, Annie Humphreys. 

She married John W. Morton, who served as a captain in the Confederate States Army during the Civil War. Afterward he was a founder of the Nashville chapter of the Ku Klux Klan. Reportedly Morton initiated former Confederate general Nathan Bedford Forrest into the KKK.

Works
Suggestions on the Subject of Bank Charters (1859)
Some Suggestions on the Subject of Monopolies and Special Charters (1859)
An Address on the Use of Alcoholic Liquors and the Consequences (1879)

References

Further reading
 Robinson, William M., Justice in Grey: A History of the Judicial System of the Confederate States (Cambridge (MA), 1941)

|-

|-

|-

1806 births
1882 deaths
19th-century American judges
19th-century American politicians
American people of Welsh descent
American temperance activists
Impeached United States federal judges removed from office
Judges of the Confederate States of America
Judges of the United States District Court for the Eastern District of Tennessee
Judges of the United States District Court for the Middle District of Tennessee
Judges of the United States District Court for the Western District of Tennessee
Members of the Tennessee House of Representatives
People from Montgomery County, Tennessee
People from Somerville, Tennessee
People of Tennessee in the American Civil War
Tennessee Attorneys General
United States federal judges appointed by Franklin Pierce
Writers from Tennessee